James Allen (18 August 1913 – 1979) was a professional footballer, who played for Stakeford Albion, Huddersfield Town and Queens Park Rangers and Clapton Orient.

Biography
James Allen was born in Amble, Northumberland, on 18 August 1913. He was a right half-back who played for Northumberland club Stakeford Albion before joining Huddersfield Town in March 1934, where he made a solitary appearance against Preston North End in January 1935. He transferred to Queens Park Rangers in April 1935, for whom he made 45 senior appearances, and then joined Clapton Orient on a free transfer in May 1937, making five senior appearances in the 1937–38 season. Allen died in Hammersmith, London, in 1979.

References

allfootballers.com (registration required)

1913 births
1979 deaths
English footballers
People from Amble
Footballers from Northumberland
Association football defenders
English Football League players
Huddersfield Town A.F.C. players
Queens Park Rangers F.C. players
Leyton Orient F.C. players